America is a short-form name for the United States of America.

America or América may also refer to:

Places
 The Americas, a landmass comprising the continents of North America and South America

Argentina
 América, Buenos Aires, Argentina

Colombia 
 La América, Commune of Medellín, Colombia

Mexico 
 América, Tamaulipas, Mexico
 América II, Tamaulipas, Mexico

United States 
 America, Illinois, U.S.
 America, Indiana, U.S.
 America, Oklahoma, U.S.

Other
 America, Limburg, Netherlands
 916 America, an asteroid

Arts, entertainment, and media

Films 
 America (1924 film), by D. W. Griffith
 America (2009 film), an American made-for-television film
 América (2010 film), from Portugal
 America (2011 film), from Puerto Rico
 America (2022 film), mainly Israeli film
 America: Freedom to Fascism, a 2006 documentary
 America: Imagine the World Without Her, a 2014 documentary film based on a book by Dinesh D'Souza
 America America, a 1963 American film by Elia Kazan

Literature
 "America" (Judge Dredd story), by John Wagner
 America (novel), a 2002 young adult novel by E. R. Frank
 "America" (poem), 1956, by Allen Ginsberg
 "America" (short story), by Orson Scott Card
 America, a Jake Grafton novel by Stephen Coonts
 "America", a poem by Walt Whitman from Leaves of Grass
 Amerika (novel), by Franz Kafka
 America, Jean Baudrillard 1988

Music

Groups and labels
 America (band)
 America Records (France), a jazz record label

Albums 
 America (America album), 1971
 America (Kurtis Blow album), 1985
 America (Dan Deacon album), 2012
 America (John Fahey album), 1971
 America (Havalina album), 1999
 America (Julio Iglesias album), 1976
 America (Modern Talking album), 2001
 America (Wadada Leo Smith album), 2009
 America, a 1989 album by George Adams
 America: An Album for All Ages, a 2009 album by Bobby Susser
 America – The EP, a 2006 EP by Rebecca St. James
 América & En Vivo, a 1992 EP by Luis Miguel
 America (Thirty Seconds to Mars album), 2018

Songs 

 "America" (Deuce song), 2012
 "America" (Neil Diamond song), 1980
 "America" (Waylon Jennings song)
 "America" (Killing Joke song), 1988
 "America" (Prince song), 1985
 "America" (Razorlight song), 2006
 "America" (Simon & Garfunkel song), 1968
 "America" (Sufjan Stevens song), 2020
 "America", a song by Tracy Chapman from Where You Live
 "America", a song by David Essex from the 1974 album David Essex
 "America", a song by Imagine Dragons from Night Visions
 "America", a song by London Grammar from their 2021 album Californian Soil
 "America", a 1982 song by Motörhead from Iron Fist
 "America", a song by Nas from his untitled ninth studio album
 "América", a song by José Luis Perales
 "America", a song by Royce da 5'9" from Layers
 "America", a song by Santana featuring P.O.D. from Shaman
 "America", a song by Bree Sharp from her 1999 debut album A Cheap and Evil Girl
 "America", a song by Steppenwolf from the album Monster
 "America", a song by Bobby Susser from America: An Album for All Ages
 "America", a song by Wu-Tang Clan and Killah Priest from America Is Dying Slowly
 "America (Never Been)", a song by Car Seat Headrest from How to Leave Town
 "America" (West Side Story song)
 "America (My Country, 'Tis of Thee)", a patriotic song of the United States
 "America the Beautiful", a patriotic anthem of the United States

Radio and television stations 
 America (XM), a satellite radio channel
 América 2, an Argentine television station
 America One, an American over-the-air television network 
 América Televisión, a Peruvian television network

Television
 América (Brazilian TV series), a telenovela
 America (American TV series), a talk show
 America: A Personal History of the United States, a BBC documentary series
 America: The Story of Us, a six-part documentary on the history of the United States

Other uses in arts, entertainment, and media
 America (magazine), a magazine published by the Jesuits
 America (The Book), a 2006 book by the staff of The Daily Show with Jon Stewart
 America (toilet), a sculpture by Maurizio Cattelan
 America (video game), 2001

People 
 América Alonso (1936–2022), Venezuelan actress
 América Barrios (1917–2001), Cuban actress
 America Waldo Bogle (1844–1903), American pioneer
 America McCutchen Drennan (1830–1903), American educator and missionary
 America Ferrera (born 1984), American actress
 America Martin (born 1980), American artist
 America Meredith (born 1972), American artist
 America Newton (1835–1917), American pioneer
 America Olivo (born 1978), American actress
 America W. Robinson (1855–1912), American educator
 América del Pilar Rodrigo, Argentinian botanist
 America Iglesias Thatcher (1907–1989), Puerto Rican labor activist
 America Thayer (died 2021), American murder victim
 America Young (born 1984), American actress
 America Vera Zavala (born 1976), Swedish politician

Fictional characters
 America Chavez, superhero from Marvel Comics

Ships and boats
 America (yacht), winner of the America's Cup in 1851
 America-class amphibious assault ship, of the U.S.
 America-class steamship, Cunard sidewheel transatlantic steamships
 RMS America, first of the America-class
 French ship America (1788), a Téméraire-class ship of the French Navy
 America-class ship of the line, derived from the French ship America
 Grande America, an Italian cargo ship, sunken on 12 March 2019 near France
 HMS America, any of several ships of the Royal Navy
 SS America, any of several ships of that name
 USS America, any of several ships of the US Navy
 Herreshoff America, an American catboat design

Sports 

 América de Cali, an association football (soccer) club from Cali, Colombia
 América Football Club (disambiguation)
 América Managua, an association football (soccer) club from Managua, Nicaragua
 Club América, an association football (soccer) club from Mexico City
 Copa América (Spanish and Portuguese for "America Cup"), association football (soccer) competition in South America

Transportation
 America (aircraft), used by Richard E. Byrd on a 1927 transatlantic flight
 America (airship), flown in 1907 and 1909 attempts to reach the North Pole, and a 1910 attempt to cross the Atlantic
 America (American automobile)
 America (Spanish automobile)

Other uses 
 Apollo 17 Command/Service Module (callsign "America")
 American (word)
 Americas (terminology)
 Naming of the Americas

See also 
 Air America (disambiguation)
 American (disambiguation)
 Americana (disambiguation)
 Amerigo Vespucci (1454–1512), for whom the Americas were named
 Amerika (disambiguation)
 Amerrique Mountains
 Amreeka, a 2009 film
 Pan-American (disambiguation)
 The American (disambiguation)
 The Americans (disambiguation)
 Armorica